Victor Huthart (16 December 1924 – 12 February 1997) was a British sports shooter. He competed in the trap event at the 1960 Summer Olympics.

References

1924 births
1997 deaths
British male sport shooters
Olympic shooters of Great Britain
Shooters at the 1960 Summer Olympics
Sportspeople from London
People from Dalston
People from the London Borough of Hackney